Kapugaz (also Romanized as Kapūgaz; also known as Kafūgaz and Kafūzak) is a village in Momenabad Rural District, in the Central District of Sarbisheh County, South Khorasan Province, Iran. At the 2006 census, its population was 120, in 35 families.

References 

Populated places in Sarbisheh County